Lincoln County High School is a high school in Lincolnton, Georgia, United States. Its motto is "Forever Learning, Forever Leading".

References

External links
Lincoln County High School

Schools in Lincoln County, Georgia
Public high schools in Georgia (U.S. state)